Jason Broyles (born April 27, 1973) is an American professional wrestler. He is best known for his tenure in Extreme Championship Wrestling (ECW) under the ring name E. Z. Money. He also briefly wrestled for World Championship Wrestling (WCW) in 2001 under the ring name Jason Jett.

Professional wrestling career

Early career (1990–2000) 
Broyles made his professional wrestling debut in 1990 after training himself. In 1994 he worked for Jim Cornette's Smoky Mountain Wrestling, he was known as Steve Skyfire and was mainly used as a jobber.

Extreme Championship Wrestling (2000–2001) 
After working on the independent circuit for ten years, he made his Extreme Championship Wrestling debut on June 2, 2000 under the ring name Steve Skyfire in a losing effort to Chilly Willy. Eight days later, Broyles made his televised debut for ECW as E. Z. Money in a losing effort to Kid Kash. After wrestling in singles matches to mixed results over the next few weeks, Money formed an alliance with Chris Hamrick. After Hamrick helped Money defeat Julio Fantastico, with whom he had a brief feud, Fantastico joined Money and Hamrick after being unable to defeat them. Fantastico then renamed himself Julio Dinero and the stable became known as Hot Commodity. Hot Commodity was rather unsuccessful, however, as they only won two matches together. Despite this, Money and Dinero were granted a title match against then-World Tag Team Champions Danny Doring and Roadkill on January 7, 2001 at ECW's final pay-per-view Guilty as Charged, which they lost. Money and Dinero received a rematch for the title five days later, but were again defeated. Hot Commodity stayed together until ECW declared bankruptcy in 2001 and was subsequently shut down.

World Championship Wrestling (2001) 
After ECW declared bankruptcy, Broyles soon started working for World Championship Wrestling. He made his debut for WCW on the March 7 episode of Thunder as Jason B, where he and Scotty O lost to 3 Count (Shannon Moore and Evan Karagias) in the quarterfinals of a tournament to determine the promotion's first Cruiserweight Tag Team Champions. The following week on Thunder, Broyles was renamed to Jason Jett and defeated Alex Wright. On March 18 at WCW's final pay-per-view Greed, Jett defeated Kwee Wee. The following night on Nitro, Jett defeated Disqo. On the March 21 episode of Thunder, Jett defeated fellow ECW alumnus Cash in the latter's debut for WCW.

World Wrestling Federation (2001–2002) 
Broyles remained with WCW until it was purchased by the World Wrestling Federation in late March. After his contract was picked up by the WWF, he was sent to the Heartland Wrestling Association, one of their development territories. While in the HWA, Broyles won the promotion's Heavyweight Championship twice before being released from his contract in July 2002.

Independent circuit (2002–2003, 2007–2015) 
After being released from his WWF contract, Broyles made a few appearances in Total Nonstop Action Wrestling, Ring of Honor and the Frontier Wrestling Alliance under his E. Z. Money ring name before retiring in 2003. After retiring, he began working as a tailor for wrestlers, designing attire such as boots and trunks.

On January 27, 2007, Broyles, as E. Z. Money, wrestled his first match in nearly four years as he defeated The Brother Grimm at Championship Wrestling Alliance's House Party event. On February 17, Money defeated Mathias Grimm at the CWA's Snowed The F Out event. On July 28, Money made his final appearance for the CWA as he won a four-way match against Chase Owens, Greg Rocker, and O-Dog.  On October 12, 2013, Broyles, as EZ Money teamed with Eddie Golden in a losing effort to the NWA Tennessee Tag Team Champions Air America (Skylar Kruze and Gavin Daring) in a title match for NWA Smoky Mountain.

On June 14, 2014, E. Z. Money teamed with Reborn Champion Cody Ices and Anthony Brody in a losing effort against Jake "The Snake" Roberts, The Stallion and Alex Cage in the main event for Reborn Wrestling.

On September 26, 2015 E. Z. Money lost against Ethan Carter III in a match for the TNA World Heavyweight Championship. The match took place in a Pro Wrestling South card at the Sullivan South High School in Tennessee.

Professional wrestling style and persona 
Broyles' most well-known character was "E. Z. Money", which was notable for his stint as a member of Hot Commodity in ECW. He used Cha-Ching as his finishing move and a wide range of signature moves which included a swinging cradle suplex followed by a powerbomb called Electric Dreams, an E. Z. Driver, an inverted crucifix powerbomb, a moonsault, a reverse piledriver hold transitioned into an inverted double underhook facebuster called Money Bag, a slingshot somersault clothesline and the Money in the Bank. He used "For the Love of Money" / "Down on Me" mix by The O'Jays and Jackyl and "Down on Me" by Jackyl as his entrance theme song in ECW and ROH.

He also used a character called "Jason Jett" during his brief WCW stint in the final days of WCW. In WCW, he used Crash Landing as his finishing move.

Championships and accomplishments 
Heartland Wrestling Association
HWA Heavyweight Championship (2 times)
National Wrestling League
NWL Tag Team Championship (1 time) - with Big Easy & Cory Bush 
Pro Wrestling Illustrated
PWI ranked him #164 of the 500 best singles wrestlers in the PWI 500 in 2002
Southern States Wrestling
SSW Heavyweight Championship (1 time)

References

External links 
 EZTights.com
 
 

1973 births
American male professional wrestlers
Living people
Professional wrestlers from New Jersey
Sportspeople from Atlantic City, New Jersey